is a railway station in Kasuya, Fukuoka Prefecture, Japan. It is operated by Kyushu Railway Company (JR Kyushu).

Lines
JR Kyushu
Sasaguri Line (Fukuhoku Yutaka Line)
Kashii Line

Layout
It is a ground level station with one platform one track for Kashii Line almost intercrosses above one island platform two tracks for Sasaguri Line in a right angle.

Tracks

Adjacent stations 

|-
|colspan=5 style="text-align:center;" |JR Kyūshū

History
The station was opened by JR Kyushu on 13 March 1988 as an additional station on the existing track of the Sasaguri Line.

Passenger statistics
In fiscal 2016, the station was used by an average of 3,774 passengers daily (boarding passengers only), and it ranked 55th among the busiest stations of JR Kyushu.

External links
 Chōjabaru Station (JR Kyushu)

References

Railway stations in Japan opened in 1988
Railway stations in Fukuoka Prefecture
Stations of Kyushu Railway Company